Veniamin Aleksandrovich Shumeyko (born 2 February 1989) is a Kyrgyzstani professional footballer who plays as a centre-back for Kyrgyz Premier League club Alga Bishkek.

Career
Personal Honours:

2008 Kyrgyzstan League Runners-Up with FC Abdysh-Ata Kant

2009 Kyrgyzstan League Runners-Up and Cup with FC Abdysh-Ata Kant

2010 Kyrgyzstan League 2nd Runners-Up with FC Abdysh-Ata Kant

2011 Kyrgyzstan League 2nd Runners-Up and Cup with FC Abdysh-Ata Kant

2012 Kyrgyzstan League Runners-Up and Cup Runners-Up with FC Alga Bishek

2013 Kyrgyzstan League and Cup Double with FC Alay Osh

2015 Kyrgyzstan League 2nd Runners-Up and Cup with FC Abdysh-Ata Kant

2017/18 I-League Man-of-the-Match Award vs Shillong Lajong FC

Named one of I-League's defensive giants

Signed for UiTM F.C from the Malaysia Premier League on 30 May 2018.

International career
He is a member of the Kyrgyzstan national football team from 2011. He made his debut in the match vs. Uzbekistan, played on 28 July 2011.

References

External links
Team announcement at uff.uz (in Russian)

1989 births
Living people
Sportspeople from Bishkek
Kyrgyzstani people of Russian descent
Kyrgyzstan international footballers
Kyrgyzstani footballers
Kyrgyzstani expatriate footballers
FC Abdysh-Ata Kant players
FC Alga Bishkek players
Chennai City FC players
UiTM FC players
Becamex Binh Duong FC players
Persikabo 1973 players
Kyrgyz Premier League players
I-League players
Malaysia Premier League players
V.League 1 players
Liga 1 (Indonesia) players
Expatriate footballers in India
Kyrgyzstani expatriate sportspeople in India
Expatriate footballers in Malaysia
Kyrgyzstani expatriate sportspeople in Malaysia
Expatriate footballers in Vietnam
Kyrgyzstani expatriate sportspeople in Vietnam
Expatriate footballers in Indonesia
Kyrgyzstani expatriate sportspeople in Indonesia
Association football defenders